Michael Hirsh (born April 7, 1948) is a Belgian-born Canadian producer. He has been a significant figure in the Canadian television industry, or more specifically children's programming, since the 1980s. Some of his most known productions include Committed, Blaster's Universe, Clone High, Franklin, Rolie Polie Olie, Johnny Test, Arthur, Caillou, Will and Dewitt, Spider Riders, World of Quest, Magi-Nation, The Doodlebops, Donkey Kong Country, The Magic School Bus, Beetlejuice, Moville Mysteries, Busytown Mysteries, Free Willy, Star Wars: Droids, George and Martha, Babar, Little Bear, Rupert, The Adventures of Tintin, T. and T., Pelswick, Ewoks, Gerald McBoing-Boing, Tales from the Cryptkeeper, Maggie and the Ferocious Beast, Ned's Newt, Seven Little Monsters, The Berenstain Bears, Bob and Margaret, Cyberchase, Medabots, The Care Bears Family, Rescue Heroes, Corduroy, The Edison Twins, Jacob Two-Two, Max & Ruby, Dog City, George Shrinks, Stickin' Around, Birdz,  Timothy Goes to School, Waynehead, Blazing Dragons, Marvin the Tap-Dancing Horse, Pecola, Flying Rhino Junior High, Miss Spider's Sunny Patch Friends, Redwall, Pippi Longstocking, Dumb Bunnies, The Neverending Story, Braceface, and Noonbory and the Super Seven

Personal life 
Born in Belgium in 1948, Michael's family emigrated to North America when he was a child; he was raised primarily in Toronto, Ontario, Canada and New York City. After high school, Michael attended York University in Toronto where he would meet his future business partner, Patrick Loubert. Hirsh abandoned his post-secondary education after three years to pursue his filmmaking ambitions.

Career

Nelvana 

In 1971, Hirsh co-founded Nelvana with Patrick Loubert and British-born animation artist Clive A. Smith. Under co-CEO Hirsh's leadership, the studio was responsible for many of its animated phenomena.

During this period, he co-directed the satirical live-action/animated 1972 feature Voulez-vous coucher avec God?

In the 1980s, Hirsh saved Nelvana from more than one brush with bankruptcy. After the failure of their initial feature film, Rock & Rule (in which he also worked as a storyboard artist for the film), the original distributor of their live-action show, T. and T., went out of business. Defying advice to fold the company, Michael found a replacement distributor within six weeks.

In late 1996, amid Golden Books negotiations to buy Nelvana, Hirsh went against his co-founders' advice and declined the offer. This led to a now infamous argument with the then COO of the company, Eleanor Olmstead, in which the normally mild-mannered Hirsh and Olmstead were reportedly heard "swearing up and down the hallway at one another". After remaining unaware for some time, Golden Books eventually walked out of the C$140 million deal in light of the internal discord.

In 1997, Hirsh and Nelvana helped found Teletoon along with fellow Canadian children's television production company Cinar.

In September 2000, Hirsh sold the Nelvana holdings to Corus Entertainment for C$540 million. Two years later, he was the last of the original founders to leave the studio, though the Corus press release stated that he had decided to take on an advisory role in the company.

Cookie Jar Group 

In 2004, Hirsh reestablished himself in the children's television market when he led a consortium which acquired the remains of Cinar after a financial scandal had brought that company to ruin. Cinar was bought for C$190 million and Hirsh became CEO of the new company rebranded "Cookie Jar Entertainment".

Since then, the Cookie Jar Group has been expanding in both Canada and the United States. In 2008, Cookie Jar merged with DIC Entertainment in an estimated US$87.6 million buyout, forming one of the world's largest privately held children's entertainment companies.

In 2012, Cookie Jar Entertainment was acquired by DHX Media and Hirsh became Executive Chairman of DHX Media. The combined company has a children's library of 8000 episodes and is the largest supplier of kids programming to online streaming services, as well as a leader in production and licensing and merchandising for children.

WOW Unlimited Media Inc. 
Near the end of 2015, three years after DHX Media's acquisition of Cookie Jar, Hirsh left to found a new production company called Ezrin Hirsh Entertainment with music producer Bob Ezrin. Ezrin Hirsh and producer/entrepreneur Fred Seibert (and his company Frederator Networks, Inc.) together worked out an arrangement with Vancouver's Rainmaker Entertainment and on 26 October 2016 Rainmaker purchased the companies and also announced that Rainmaker's assets will consolidate its divisions under a new holding company called WOW! Unlimited Media Inc. Hirsh will serve as CEO and chairman for the holding company, with Seibert as Chief Creative Officer and CEO of Frederator.

Awards 
A number of productions that Michael has been involved with have been nominated for or won awards. For their work on shows including Beetlejuice, Babar, Little Bear, Rupert, Franklin, Rolie Polie Olie and The Adventures of Tintin, Hirsh and his colleagues have received awards such as Daytime Emmys and Geminis.

References

External links 
 
  An AWN article on Hirsh's involvement in the co-production field

Nelvana
1948 births
20th-century Canadian screenwriters
21st-century Canadian screenwriters
Living people
Belgian emigrants to Canada
Belgian film producers
Belgian chief executives
Belgian television producers
Belgian storyboard artists
Belgian screenwriters
Film producers from Ontario
Canadian television executives
Canadian chief executives
Canadian television producers
Canadian storyboard artists
Canadian male screenwriters
Chief operating officers
Film directors from Toronto
Writers from Toronto
The Bronx High School of Science alumni